Harttia surinamensis is a species of armored catfish of the family native to the coastal rivers of Suriname and French Guiana. This species grows to a length of  SL.

References 

 

surinamensis
Taxa named by Marinus Boeseman
Fish described in 1971
Fish of French Guiana
Fish of Suriname